Coccidotrophus is a genus of beetles in the family Silvanidae, containing the following species:

 Coccidotrophus cordiae Barber
 Coccidotrophus socialis Schwarz & Barber, 1921

References

Silvanidae genera